Singhania University The university was established by the Govt. of Rajasthan, under Ordinance 6 of 2007.  It is a UGC recognized private university as per Sec. 2f of the UGC Act 1956. It is in Pacheri Bari, Jhunjhunu in the northern Indian state of Rajasthan.

History 

Singhania University came in existence by Smt. Narmada Devi Singhanaia, mother of the founder Shri. D.C. Singhania.

Singhania University was inaugurated on 21 Oct 2007 by Shri D.C. Singhania.

The university was established by the Govt. of Rajasthan, under Ordinance 6 of 2007. It is a UGC recognized university as per Sec. 2f of the UGC Act 1956.

Its pioneering batch of students graduated in 2010.

Academics 
Singhania University has more than 200 programs in 50 disciplines. It offers graduate, postgraduate and doctoral degree programs in engineering. It has a management school that offers graduate, postgraduate, and doctoral degree programs in management.

Campus
Singhania University is in Pacheri Bari, Distt. Jhunjhunu (Rajasthan) on the Delhi-Narnaul Singhana - Pilani Road. It is about 160 km west of Delhi and about 165 km north of Jaipur. The campus covers an area of about 30 acres of land.

References

External links 
Singhania University Official Website 
 Singhania University
UGC Web

Universities in Rajasthan
Education in Jhunjhunu district
Educational institutions established in 2007
2007 establishments in Rajasthan